CP1 may refer to:

 CP1 (classification), a disability sport classification specific to cerebral palsy
 Am star, a class of chemically-peculiar stars
 Chicago Pile-1, the World's first artificial nuclear reactor
 Complex projective line, or Riemann sphere, in mathematics
 Vektor CP1, a South African pistol
 Warren CP-1, an experimental monoplane
 CP1: an EEG electrode site according to the 10-20 system
 Pasir Ris MRT station, MRT station code
Cours Préparatoire 1re année, first year of primary education in the French-like education system (e.g. Côte d'Ivoire)